Weston Arthur Bate  (24 September 1924 – 31 October 2017) was an Australian historian.

Bate served in the Royal Australian Air Force during the Second World War. He studied at the University of Melbourne under Manning Clark, Max Crawford, Kathleen Fitzpatrick and John O'Brien. He taught at Brighton Grammar School, Melbourne Grammar School, Bradfield College (Berkshire), and (from 1952 to 1976) at the University of Melbourne. From 1978 until 1989 Bate held the foundation chair of Australian Studies at Deakin University, Geelong. 

Bate was President of the Royal Historical Society of Victoria. He died in October 2017 at the age of 93.

Bibliography
A history of Brighton (1962)
Lucky city: the first generation at Ballarat, 1851–1901 (1978)
Dilemma at Westernport: a case study in land use conflicts and the growth of the planning imperative (1978, with Fay Marles)
Private lives – public heritage: family snapshots as history (1986, with Euan McGillivray and Matthew Nickson)
Victorian gold rushes (1988)
Having a go: Bill Boyd’s Mallee (1989, with Bill Boyd)
Light blue down-under: the history of Geelong Grammar School (1990)
Life after gold: twentieth-century Ballarat (1993)
Essential but unplanned: the story of Melbourne’s lanes (1994)
Here’s to grandpa!: the watercolours 1900–1940 of C.A. Wilson (1995)
Sustaining their dream: the Metropolitan Golf Club 1901–2001 (2001)
Challenging traditions: a history of Melbourne Grammar (2002)
Heads, you win!: a history of the Barwon Heads Golf Club  (2007)

References

1924 births
2017 deaths
20th-century Australian historians
Royal Australian Air Force personnel of World War II
Academics from Melbourne
Academic staff of Deakin University
Recipients of the Medal of the Order of Australia
Royal Australian Air Force officers
University of Melbourne alumni
Academic staff of the University of Melbourne